Vauville is a former commune in the Manche department in Normandy in north-western France. On 1 January 2017, it was merged into the new commune La Hague.

See also
Communes of the Manche department

References

Former communes of Manche
Manche communes articles needing translation from French Wikipedia